George V Avenue may refer to:

 King George V Avenue of Memorial English Oaks, New South Wales, Australia
 Avenue George V, Paris, France

See also 
 George V